Crassispira aurea is a species of sea snail, a marine gastropod mollusk in the family Pseudomelatomidae.

Description
The length of the shell attains 20 mm.

Distribution
This marine species occurs off Tahiti and in the Society, Tuamotus and Gambier archipelagoes.

References

 Kantor Y.I., Stahlschmidt P., Aznar-Cormano L., Bouchet P. & Puillandre N. (2017). Too familiar to be questioned? Revisiting the Crassispira cerithina species complex (Gastropoda: Conoidea: Pseudomelatomidae). Journal of Molluscan Studies. 83 (1): 43-55
 Tröndle, J. & Boutet, M. 2009. Inventory of marine molluscs of French Polynesia. Atoll Research Bulletin, 570: 1–87 (as Crassispira cerithina)

External links
 
 

aurea
Gastropods described in 2017